Sinéad Cahalan is a camogie player. She won camogie All Star awards in 2005 and 2008 and played in the All Ireland final 2008, 2010 and 2011.

Other awards
Gael Linn Cup 2008, Senior National League 2005, All Ireland Intermediate 2004, All Ireland Junior 2003, 2004, two Club County medals underage, Pan Celtic 2007, Ashbourne Shield with Mary Immaculate Limerick 2005.

References

Year of birth missing (living people)
Place of birth missing (living people)
Living people
Galway camogie players